Honorary citizenship is a status bestowed by a city or other government on a foreign or native individual whom it considers to be especially admirable or otherwise worthy of the distinction. The honour usually is symbolic and does not confer any change to citizenship or nationality.

North America 
By act of United States Congress and presidential assent, an individual may be named an honorary citizen of the United States. Since 1963, it has been awarded to only eight individuals.

Honorary Canadian citizenship requires unanimous approval in both houses of Parliament. The only people to ever receive honorary Canadian citizenship are Raoul Wallenberg posthumously in 1985; Nelson Mandela in 2001; the 14th Dalai Lama Tenzin Gyatso in 2006; Aung San Suu Kyi in 2007 (revoked in 2018); Prince Karim Aga Khan in 2009; and Malala Yousafzai in 2014.

Europe 
In Germany honorary citizenship is awarded by cities, towns and sometimes federal states. The honorary citizenship is perpetual and persists after the death of the honoree, but can be revoked in exceptional cases by the council or parliament of the city, town, or state. In the case of war criminals, all such honours were taken away by "Article VIII, section II, letter i of the directive 38 of the Allied Control Council for Germany" on 12 October 1946.

In Ireland, honorary citizenship bestowed on a foreigner is full legal citizenship including the right to reside and vote.

Israel 
Members of the Righteous Among the Nations may be conferred honorary Israeli citizenship by Yad Vashem, or commemorative citizenship if deceased. Those who choose to live in Israel are entitled to a pension, free health care, and assistance with housing and nursing care.

Examples 
 Berlin awarded Lucius D. Clay 1962 for his role as military governor and for creating the Berlin airlift and Mikhail Gorbachev for his change in world politics that led to the fall of the Berlin Wall and the reunification of Germany.
 Che Guevara was made an honorary citizen of Cuba by Fidel Castro for his part in the Cuban Revolution. Embarking on fomenting revolutions in other countries, Che Guevara, in his farewell letter to Fidel, gave up all his official ties to Cuba, including citizenship.
 In 2002 South Korea awarded honorary citizenship to Dutch football (soccer) coach Guus Hiddink who successfully and unexpectedly took the national team to the semi-finals of the 2002 FIFA World Cup. Honorary citizenship was also awarded to Hines Ward, an American football player of Korean and African-American descent, in 2006 for his efforts to minimize discrimination in Korea against half-Koreans.
 To mark the occasion of the 50th anniversary of the first successful ascent of Everest the Nepalese government conferred honorary citizenship upon Edmund Hillary at a special Golden Jubilee celebration in Kathmandu, Nepal. He was the first foreign national to receive that honour.
 At the end of their studies, all the students of the College of Europe are invited to the city hall by the mayor of Bruges to become honorary citizens of the city of Bruges.
 In 2005, actress Angelina Jolie received an honorary Cambodian citizenship in 2005 for her humanitarian efforts
 In March 2007, cricketers Matthew Hayden and Herschelle Gibbs were awarded honorary citizenship of St. Kitts and Nevis, following their record-breaking innings in the 2007 Cricket World Cup
 In 2011, Lady Gaga received the title of honorary citizen of Sydney for her support of the LGBT+ community.
 In April 2013, Raoul Wallenberg became the first person to be granted an honorary Australian citizenship.
 In August 2013, French actor Gérard Depardieu received an honorary citizenship by Belgium.
 In October 2013, Argentinian football coach José Pekerman received Colombian citizenship after he qualified Colombia to the 2014 FIFA World Cup, the first World Cup for the country after a 16-year hiatus.
 On 12 April 2017, Malala Yousafzai of Pakistan was awarded honorary Canadian citizenship by PM Justin Trudeau for her work on providing education to girls in her hometown Swat during Taliban occupation.
 On 12 July 2017, Ariana Grande was made an honorary citizen of Manchester for her efforts to raise funds for victims of 22 May 2017 terrorist attack in Manchester Arena.
 In August 2019, Guillermo Rodriguez, a security guard on Jimmy Kimmel Live, became an honorary citizen of Dildo, Newfoundland, Canada, after TV host Jimmy Kimmel ran for mayor.
 On 7 October 2019, Afghanistan granted honorary Afghan citizenship to Japanese physician Tetsu Nakamura for his long-standing humanitarian work in the country.
 Pakistan gave honorary citizenship to St Lucian cricketer Darren Sammy on 23 March 2020.
 On 9 June 2022, a House Resolution granted the title of Brazilian citizen to British  Formula 1 driver Sir Lewis Hamilton.

See also 
 Freedom of the City

References

External links 
 

 
Citizenship